Her Marriage Lines is a 1917 British silent crime film directed by Frank Wilson and starring Stewart Rome, Chrissie White and Violet Hopson.

Cast
 Stewart Rome as Godfrey  
 Chrissie White as Jean Neville 
 Violet Hopson as Sybil Ransley  
 Lionelle Howard as Stephen Maybridge  
 Henry Vibart as Lord Ransly  
 Florence Nelson as Lady Ransley  
 Frank Wilson as Rev. Neville

References

Bibliography
 Palmer, Scott. British Film Actors' Credits, 1895-1987. McFarland, 1988.

External links

1917 films
1917 crime drama films
British crime drama films
British silent feature films
Films directed by Frank Wilson
Films set in England
Hepworth Pictures films
British black-and-white films
1910s English-language films
1910s British films
Silent crime drama films